The 1894 Rutgers Queensmen football team was an American football team that represented Rutgers University during the 1894 college football season. The team compiled a 4–6 record and was outscored by a total of 210 to 61.

The team had no coach, and its captain was William V. B. Van Dyck. Van Dyck later served as the head coach of the Rutgers football teams of 1898 and 1899. 

The Rutgers football team won its two home games, playing both of those games at Neilson Field in New Brunswick, New Jersey.

Schedule

References

Rutgers
Rutgers Scarlet Knights football seasons
Rutgers Queensmen football